Alberico (Alberic) Crescitelli (1863–1900), Chinese name Guo Xide, was an Italian Catholic priest and missionary to China. Born in Italy on 30 June 1863, Alberico Crescitelli entered the Pontifical Institute for Foreign Missions in 1880 and was ordained a priest on 4 June 1887. The following year he went to China and began work in southern Shaanxi.

Crescitelli was believed to have been killed in the Boxer Rebellion. Crescitelli's confreres, who had known him well and for many years, started his beatification cause in 1908, only eight years after his death. The testimony provided by the confreres was unanimous about the holiness of Crescitelli's life.

At the Vatican, in St. Peter's Basilica on 18 February 1951, Pope Pius XII declared Alberico Crescitelli "blessed." The Pope's speech was memorable especially for the passage in which he described Father Crescitelli's martyrdom:

Pope John Paul II included him in the list of 120 Martyr Saints of China canonized in St. Peter's Square on October 1, 2000.

This large group canonisation was bitterly opposed in China itself, with Bishop Fu Tieshan, the leader of the state-run Chinese Patriotic Catholic Association describing it as "intolerable". A statement released by the Chinese Foreign Ministry alleged that "some of those canonised by the Vatican this time perpetrated outrages such as raping or looting in China and committed unforgivable crimes against the Chinese people." A further statement from China's State Administration of Religious Affairs singled out Alberico Crescitelli for special comment, alleging that he had been "notorious for taking the 'right of the first night' of each bride under his diocese." The Catholic Church's Holy Spirit Study Centre in Hong Kong has described the accusations as baseless.

In his homily at the canonisation ceremony on 1 October 2000, Pope John Paul II made a statement asking for forgiveness for any past wrongs by the missionaries to China: "There are those who with a partial and not very objective reading of history see only limits and errors in their action. If they happened - is there any man exempt from defects? - we ask for forgiveness."

External links
Alberico Crescitelli - martire in Cina (Italian) - biography published 2005, Bologna (overview)

References

Italian Roman Catholic missionaries
Roman Catholic missionaries in China
1863 births
1900 deaths
Italian Roman Catholic saints
19th-century Italian Roman Catholic priests
People of the Boxer Rebellion
19th-century Christian saints
People from the Province of Avellino
Italian emigrants to China